David Rowlands may refer to:

 David Rowlands (civil servant), British civil servant
 David Rowlands (Dewi Môn), Welsh Congregational minister, college head and poet
 David Rowlands (politician), Welsh politician
 David Rowlands (surgeon), Welsh naval surgeon

See also
 David Rowland (disambiguation), multiple people